The Chief Minister (Manx: Ard-hirveishagh) is the executive head of the Isle of Man Government.

The office derives from that of Chairman of the Executive Council. Before 1980 the Executive Council was chaired by the Lieutenant Governor, but thereafter the chairman was elected by Tynwald, the parliament of the Isle of Man. The title was changed to "Chief Minister" in 1986.

The Chief Minister is appointed by the Lieutenant Governor on the nomination of the House of Keys (formerly the nomination of Tynwald) after a general election for the House of Keys. He holds office until the next general election (i.e. normally for five years) and is eligible for re-appointment, but may be removed from office by simple majority in Tynwald on a vote of no confidence in the Council of Ministers. 

The incumbent Chief Minister is Alfred Cannan, who has held the office since 12 October 2021.

List of officeholders

Chairmen of the Executive Council

Chief Ministers

Timeline
This is a graphical lifespan timeline of Chief Ministers of the Isle of Man. Twelve people have served as Chief Minister of the Isle of Man since 1961. They are listed in order of office (Radcliffe, Gelling, and Bell are shown in order of their first terms).

<div style="overflow:auto">

See also
Chief Minister
Chairman of the Executive Council

Notes

References

Government of the Isle of Man